The 1983 Thailand Masters was a professional non-ranking snooker tournament held in August 1983 in Bangkok, Thailand.

Tony Meo won the tournament, defeating Steve Davis 2–1 in the final.

Main draw

References

1983 in snooker
1983 in Thai sport
Sport in Thailand